Psiloceratidae is an extinct family of cephalopods belonging to the ammonite subclass.

Description
The Psiloceratidae are evolute, smooth or with blunt primary ribbing. The venter is rounded and generally smooth, in some feebly keeled. Sutures are simple with phylloid saddle endings in some. The aptychus is single, found in sutu in Psiloceras

Genera

 Badouxia Guex and Taylor, 1976
 Caloceras
 Discamphiceras
 Euphyllites Wahner, 1898
 Franziceras Buckman, 1923
 Kammerkaroceras
 Laqueoceras
 Murihikuites Stevens, 2004
 Paradiscamphiceras Taylor, 1988
 Paraphylloceras Salfeld, 1919
 Psiloceras
 Psilophyllites

Distribution
Fossils of species within this genus have been found in the Triassic rocks of Canada, in the Jurassic rocks of Argentina, Austria, Canada, China, France, Germany, Hungary, Mexico, New Zealand, Spain), United Kingdom, United States, as well as in the Cretaceous of Australia and Russia.

References

 Arkell, W.J.; Kummel, B.; Wright, C.W. (1957). Mesozoic Ammonoidea. Treatise on Invertebrate Paleontology, Part L, Mollusca 4. Lawrence, Kansas: Geological Society of America and University of Kansas Press.

 
Ammonitida families
Psiloceratoidea
Rhaetian first appearances
Maastrichtian extinctions